Bálint Magosi (born 15 August 1989) is a Hungarian professional ice hockey forward who currently plays for DVTK Jegesmedvék of the MOL Liga. He has formerly played with Austrian Hockey League side Alba Volán Székesfehérvár. Magosi joined the club from county rivals Dunaújvárosi Acélbikák in June 2011.

References

External links

1989 births
Fehérvár AV19 players
Diables Rouges de Briançon players
Dunaújvárosi Acélbikák players
DVTK Jegesmedvék players
Living people
Sportspeople from Dunaújváros
Hungarian ice hockey forwards
20th-century Hungarian people
21st-century Hungarian people